Fantasy Studios was a music recording studio in Berkeley, California, at the Zaentz Media Center, known for its recording of award-winning albums including Journey's Escape and Green Day's Dookie. Built as a private recording studio for artists on the Fantasy Records label in 1971, it was opened to the public in 1980 for recording, mixing and mastering. It was permanently closed on September 15, 2018.

History

Fantasy Records
Fantasy Records and its subsidiary, Galaxy, were established in San Francisco, California, in 1949 by Max and Sol Weiss. The first artist on the label was Dave Brubeck. With help from profits earned from his records the label went on to record Gerry Mulligan, Chet Baker, Cal Tjader and Vince Guaraldi. In addition to musical acts, the label recorded beat poets Lawrence Ferlinghetti and Allen Ginsberg and comic Lenny Bruce.

Creedence Clearwater Revival and expansion
Saul Zaentz, who joined Fantasy Records as a salesman in 1955, assembled a group of investors in 1967 and purchased the label from the Weiss brothers.  In 1968 Fantasy Records signed Creedence Clearwater Revival (CCR), who soon became extremely profitable for the label. Within eighteen months, twenty of CCR's singles made Billboard Hot 100 list and nine were consecutive Top 10 singles in the US. The band also earned 21 RIAA-certified gold or platinum records with total sales of over 100 million worldwide.  These successes for CCR made Fantasy the most profitable independent record company in the U.S. and directly resulted in the expansion of Fantasy Records.

In 1971 Fantasy Records relocated to Berkeley, California. In addition to a lobby area, the building included a sauna, an exercise room and a lunch room, which until 1981 was catered daily by Narsai's Restaurant in Kensington. The sauna and exercise room were later rebuilt for other purposes.

In the early 1970s, under the leadership of label president Ralph Kaffel, Fantasy Records purchased the catalogs of three independent jazz labels: Prestige, Riverside (established in 1953 by Bill Grauer and Orrin Keepnews) and Milestone, which Keepnews started in 1966 after the demise of Riverside. After the acquisitions the company became known as "Fantasy Inc."

Recording studios
Fantasy Records built Fantasy Studios to accommodate its growing roster, which remained primarily jazz artists but included some in rock, soul and disco. The building went up at 10th and Parker Streets in the western industrial area of Berkeley. Because of the source of funding, it was nicknamed "The House That Creedence Built." Fantasy was the most profitable independent record company in the U.S. Jim Stern, who had served as producer for the Sons of Champlin and Van Morrison, was chief engineer from 1974 until 1981. Jesse Osborn was another early engineer along with Eddie Bill Harris and Don Cody.

Studio expansion
In 1980, Fantasy Records hired a new Studio Director, Roy Segal. One of Segal's first initiatives was to the addition of Studio D, as well as upgrading the acoustical treatment and equipment in the existing studios. Such upgrades included removing carpet from the studio floors and installing bass traps and tiling for the walls in an effort to acoustically tune the rooms. Equipment upgrades included replacing the original consoles in Studios A and C with Neve 8108s and a Trident in Studio B.

In 1982, Segal was asked to manage the three-year-old Saul Zaentz Film Center, at which point he brought in Nina Bombardier to manage the studios. Bombardier started with Fantasy in 1973 as a receptionist, then moved to manage the Record Plant in Sausalito. She served as the director of Fantasy Studios from 1982 to 2007.

In addition to recording music, Fantasy Studios saw clients in the film, television, gaming and audio book industries for additional dialog recording sessions.  All studios were ISDN-compatible, providing full-frequency audio and real-time connectivity to other recording studios around the world.

There were two full-time mastering engineers on site: George Horn and Joe Tarantino. Over his career, Horn remixed or remastered albums by artists such as Charles Mingus, The Grateful Dead, Creedence Clearwater Revival and Santana. Joe Tarantino mastered albums by artists such as Stan Getz, Sonny Rollins, Dave Brubeck, Charlie Parker and Miles Davis.

Ownership changes and closure
Concord Records acquired Fantasy in late 2004 and the two labels merged to form Concord Music Group. Concord Music Group owned the studios through 2007, at which point the new owners of the Saul Zaentz Media Center, Wareham Property Group, purchased the studios. The role of Studio Director was filled by music producer Jeffrey Wood upon Bombardier's departure. Staff engineers at the time were Adam Muñoz, Jesse Nichols and Alberto Hernandez.

In 2018 Wareham Property Group decided to permanently close the studios.

Facilities
Each of Fantasy Studios' three studios were built to serve a specific purpose. There were five working natural echo chambers of varying sizes and tones, accessible from all three control rooms.

Studio A

At 1,344 square feet, Studio A could accommodate a big band, and included a DeMedio console. Small audiences could be brought in to give a recording date the feel of a live album, as Keepnews did for a 1973 Cannonball Adderley session, resulting in the album Inside Straight. Studio A also had a projection booth, pull-down screen and portable mixing console that was built for film mixes. During those early years Fantasy also had a film unit and its films (mostly promotional pieces for the label's artists) were mixed in Studio A. The film unit was headed up by Irving Saraf and Robert N. Zagone, two Bay Area documentary filmmakers. Feature films were mixed in Studio A as well, including Academy Award winners One Flew Over the Cuckoo's Nest, Apocalypse Now, Amadeus and The English Patient.

In 1980, bass traps and wall tiling were installed to improve acoustics. Studio A's mixing console was replaced with a Neve 8108, which was eventually replaced with an SSL Duality SE.

Studio B

Studio B, at 546 square feet, was used mostly for smaller acts and comedy records, and was typically used for overdub sessions. Like Studio A, it too used a DeMedio console. In 1980, bass traps and wall tiling were installed to improve acoustics. Studio B's mixing consoles replaced with a Trident, which was eventually updated to a Digidesign C24. Studio B is where Journey's Faithfully, from their Frontiers album was recorded.

Studio C
Studio C was built expressly for CCR, with a separate entrance. Parts of their albums Mardi Gras and Pendulum were recorded there, and the Live in Europe album was mixed there. John Fogerty recorded The Blue Ridge Rangers in Studio C and was in residence there until he left Fantasy in 1974. At 888 square feet, Studio C was also the site of a film soundstage and Foley pits. Studio C was the only studio at Fantasy which used an API console. Studio C was closed to the public in 2008 with the space taken over by another Zaentz Media Center tenant.

Studio D

From the profits of the 1975 Zaentz-produced film One Flew Over the Cuckoo's Nest, Fantasy Studios expanded further in 1980 with the addition of an adjoining seven-story building which included a fourth recording room, Studio D. It also marked the point at which all rooms became open for use by the public for recording, mastering and film scoring.

The new Studio D was designed by Tom Hidley and constructed by Sierra Audio. The control room featured an automated Neve 8108 board, Hidley monitors, Ampex 16- and 24-track recorders and a Studer 24-track recorder. At 1,500 square feet, the live room was built with multiple interior surfaces (unlike the other three rooms): one side of the room featured bass traps, cork and rock on the walls for a "dead" sound; the other featured hardwood floors and ceiling, and mirrored walls for a more "live" sound. Studio D's mixing console was later updated to an SSL SL 4000 E.

One of first albums to be recorded and mixed in its entirety in the newly opened Studio D was Journey's Escape, which reached #1 on the Billboard 200 Chart. The album contained such hits as "Open Arms" (which reached #2 on the Billboard Hot 100 List), "Who's Crying Now" (reaching #4 on the Billboard Hot 100 List) and "Don't Stop Believin'" (reaching #9 on the Billboard Hot 100 List). Fantasy Studios' staff engineer Wally Buck worked as Assistant Engineer on the album.

In November 2011, Studio D's original half-wood, half-carpet floors were updated to hardwood cherry flooring.

Selected major releases by year
 Jack Nitzsche - One Flew Over the Cuckoo's Nest (Original Soundtrack), 1975
 Journey - Escape, 1981
 Journey - Frontiers, 1983
 Y&T - In Rock We Trust, 1984
 Europe - The Final Countdown, 1986
 Soda Stereo - Signos, 1986
 Too Short - Life Is… Too Short, 1988
 Bobby McFerrin - Simple Pleasures, 1988
 Chris Isaak - Heart Shaped World, 1989
 Primus - Sailing the Seas of Cheese, 1991
 En Vogue - Funky Divas, 1992
 Green Day - Dookie, 1994
 Blues Traveler - Four, 1994
 Rancid - …And Out Come the Wolves, 1995
 Jawbreaker - Dear You, 1995
 Santana - Supernatural, 1999
 Santana - Shaman, 2002
 Richard Thompson - Grizzly Man (Original Soundtrack), 2005
 Joanna Newsom - Have One on Me, 2010
 Bill Frisell - All We Are Saying, 2011
 Iggy & the Stooges - Ready to Die, 2013

Recording artists

 Aerosmith
 Tori Amos
 Joan Baez
 Joshua Bell
 Tony Bennett
 Blues Traveler
 David Bowie
 Chanticleer
 Tracy Chapman
 Chuck D
 Eric Clapton
 Nels Cline
 Chick Corea
 Counting Crows
 Andraé Crouch
 Death Angel
 Francesco De Gregori
 Plácido Domingo
 Doobie Brothers
 Dr. John
 Duran Duran
 Sheila E.
 En Vogue
 Bill Evans
 Bill Frisell
 Forbidden
 Grateful Dead
 Cee-Lo Green
 Green Day
 Buddy Guy
 Sammy Hagar
 MC Hammer
 Herbie Hancock
 Ben Harper
 Isaac Hayes
 Lauryn Hill
 John Lee Hooker
 Huey Lewis and the News
 Iggy & the Stooges
 Indigo Girls
 INXS
 Chris Isaak
 Wyclef Jean
 Journey
 B.B. King
 Lil Wayne
 Los Lonely Boys
 Taj Mahal
 Dave Matthews
 Bobby McFerrin
 Sarah McLachlan
 Charles Mingus
 Mos Def
 Joanna Newsom
 Noemi
 Laura Pausini
 Pavement
 Phish
 The Pretenders
 Primus
 Rancid
 Sonny Rollins
 Santana
 Joe Satriani
 Homayoun Shajarian and Tahmoures Pournazeri
 Tears for Fears
 Testament
 The Temptations
 Richard Thompson
 Too Short
 Train
 McCoy Tyner
 U2
 The White Stripes
 Wilco
 Soda Stereo
 Stevie Wonder
 Neil Young
 Virginia Wolf
 Y&T

Producers and engineers

 Tom Allom, Producer
 Jim Anderson, Engineer
 Michael "Mike" Anderson, Engineer
 Wally Buck, Engineer
 T-Bone Burnett, Producer
 Ozzie Cadena, Producer
 Jason Carmer, Engineer
 Don Cody, Engineer
 Ben Conrad, Engineer
 Richie Corsello, Engineer
 T.J. Dougherty, Producer
 Joe Ferla, Producer
 Steve Fontano, Engineer
 Mike Fraser, Engineer
 Jim Gaines, Engineer
 Eddie Harris, Engineer
 Stephen Hart, Engineer
 Joe Henry, Producer
 Mike Herbick, Engineer
 Alberto Hernandez, Engineer
 Phil Kaffel, Engineer
 Orrin Keepnews, Producer
 Glenn Kolotkin, Engineer
 Danny Kopelson, Engineer
 Dave Luke, Engineer
 George Martin, Producer
 James McCullagh, Engineer
 Adam Muñoz, Engineer
 Jesse Nichols, Engineer
 Jesse Osborn, Engineer
 Alex Perialas, Producer
 Bob Porter, Producer
 Frank Rinella, Engineer
 Michael Rosen, Engineer
 Michael Semanick, Engineer
 Kevin Shirley, Producer
 Jake Sinclair, Engineer
 Tom Size, Engineer
 Tone Def, Producer
 Jim Stern, Engineer
 Lee Townsend, Producer
 Butch Walker, Producer
 will.i.am, Producer
 Eric Thompson, Engineer

References

Recording studios in California
Companies based in Berkeley, California
Music of the San Francisco Bay Area
Mass media companies established in 1974
Privately held companies based in California
1971 establishments in California
2018 disestablishments in California
History of the San Francisco Bay Area
Mass media companies disestablished in 2018